Mosling is an unincorporated community located in the towns of Gillett and Underhill, Oconto County, Wisconsin, United States.

History
A post office called Mosling was established in 1897, and remained in operation until it was discontinued in 1929. Mosling was named in honor of an early merchant.

References

Unincorporated communities in Oconto County, Wisconsin
Unincorporated communities in Wisconsin
Green Bay metropolitan area